Voorhees Township is a township in Camden County, in the U.S. state of New Jersey. The township is a suburb in the Delaware Valley / Greater Philadelphia Metropolitan Area. The township is a suburb in the Delaware Valley / Greater Philadelphia Metropolitan Area. As of the 2020 United States census, the township's population was 31,069, an increase of 1,938 (+6.7%) from the 2010 census count of 29,131, which in turn reflected an increase of 1,005 (+3.6%) from the 28,126 counted in the 2000 census.

Voorhees Township was incorporated as a township by an act of the New Jersey Legislature on March 1, 1899, from portions of Waterford Township. Portions of the township were taken on March 8, 1924, to form Gibbsboro.

The township is named for Foster McGowan Voorhees, the Governor of New Jersey who authorized its creation. The township is part of the state's South Jersey region.

Geography
According to the U.S. Census Bureau, the township had a total area of 11.64 square miles (30.15 km2), including 11.47 square miles (29.71 km2) of land and 0.17 square miles (0.44 km2) of water (1.44%).

Echelon, with a 2010 population of 10,743), is an unincorporated community and census-designated place in the western part of the township between Cherry Hill and Gibbsboro.

Other unincorporated communities, localities, and places located partially or completely within the township include Ashland, Brighton Heights, Glendale, Kirkwood, Kresson. and Osage.

Voorhees borders the municipalities of Berlin Township, Cherry Hill, Gibbsboro, Lawnside, Lindenwold and Somerdale in Camden County; and Evesham Township to the east in Burlington County.

Climate
Voorhees has a Humid Continental/Humid Subtropical transition climate according to (Köppen Classification) with mild to very cold winters and hot, humid summers. Temperatures have ranged from 104 °F to −7 °F.

Demographics

2010 census

The Census Bureau's 2006–2010 American Community Survey showed that (in 2010 inflation-adjusted dollars) median household income was $82,146 (with a margin of error of +/− $6,405) and the median family income was $107,000 (+/− $4,910). Males had a median income of $72,430 (+/− $6,605) versus $51,322 (+/− $2,170) for females. The per capita income for the borough was $44,169 (+/− $2,717). About 4.0% of families and 6.1% of the population were below the poverty line, including 4.9% of those under age 18 and 12.1% of those age 65 or over.

2000 census
As of the 2000 U.S. census, there were 28,126 people, 10,489 households, and 7,069 families residing in the township. The racial makeup of the township was 78.26% White, 8.00% African American, 0.14% Native American, 11.44% Asian, 0.03% Pacific Islander, 0.55% from other races, and 1.59% from two or more races. Hispanic or Latino of any race were 2.47% of the population.

There were 10,489 households, out of which 37.0% had children under the age of 18 living with them, 57.0% were married couples living together, 7.9% had a female householder with no husband present, and 32.6% were non-families. 26.9% of all households were made up of individuals, and 8.5% had someone living alone who was 65 years of age or older. The average household size was 2.60 and the average family size was 3.23.

In the township, the population was spread out, with 26.4% under the age of 18, 6.3% from 18 to 24, 31.8% from 25 to 44, 24.6% from 45 to 64, and 10.9% who were 65 years of age or older. The median age was 37 years. For every 100 females, there were 92.4 males.  For every 100 females age 18 and over, there were 87.8 males.

The median income for a household in the township was $68,402, and the median income for a family was $86,873. Males had a median income of $58,484 versus $38,897 for females. The per capita income for the township was $33,635. About 3.7% of families and 5.7% of the population were below the poverty line, including 5.7% of those under age 18 and 11.1% of those age 65 or over.

Economy
New Jersey American Water, based in Voorhees Township, is the largest water utility in New Jersey, serving over two million people in 176 communities throughout the state. New Jersey American Water is a wholly owned subsidiary of American Water.

Sports
Voorhees is the home of the Skate Zone, the training facility for the Philadelphia Flyers of the National Hockey League. Current and former players of the team often become residents of Voorhees. Voorhees includes a community park that includes a running track, children's playground, gazebo, and dedicated areas for dogs.

The Philadelphia Soul of the now defunct Arena Football League practiced at the Coliseum in Voorhees.

Government

Local government 
Voorhees Township is governed under the Township form of New Jersey municipal government, one of 141 municipalities (of the 564) statewide that use this form, the second-most commonly used form of government in the state. The Township Committee is composed of five members, who are elected directly by the voters at-large in partisan elections to serve three-year terms of office on a staggered basis, with either one or two seats coming up for election each year as part of the November general election in a three-year cycle. The Mayor and Deputy Mayors are chosen by the Township Committee from among its members during the Reorganization meeting each January.

, the members of the Voorhees Township Committee are Mayor Michael R. Mignogna (D, term on committee ends December 31, 2023; term as mayor ends 2022), Deputy Mayor Jason A. Ravitz (D, term on committee ends 2024; term as deputy mayor ends 2022), Deputy Mayor Michelle M. Nocito (D, term on committee ends 2024; term as deputy mayor ends 2022), Jacklyn Fetbroyt (D, 2022) and Harry A. Platt (D, 2023).

Federal, state, and county representation 
Voorhees Township is located in the 1st Congressional District and is part of New Jersey's 6th state legislative district.

Politics
As of March 2011, there were a total of 19,762 registered voters in Voorhees Township, of which 7,392 (37.4%) were registered as Democrats, 3,129 (15.8%) were registered as Republicans and 9,229 (46.7%) were registered as Unaffiliated. There were 12 voters registered as Libertarians or Greens.

In the 2012 presidential election, Democrat Barack Obama received 60.3% of the vote (8,479 cast), ahead of Republican Mitt Romney with 38.7% (5,450 votes), and other candidates with 1.0% (137 votes), among the 14,160 ballots cast by the township's 21,493 registered voters (94 ballots were spoiled), for a turnout of 65.9%. In the 2008 presidential election, Democrat Barack Obama received 61.1% of the vote (9,028 cast), ahead of Republican John McCain, who received around 35.3% (5,216 votes), with 14,768 ballots cast among the township's 19,553 registered voters, for a turnout of 75.5%. In the 2004 presidential election, Democrat John Kerry received 57.5% of the vote (7,835 ballots cast), outpolling Republican George W. Bush, who received around 40.2% (5,475 votes), with 13,628 ballots cast among the township's 18,325 registered voters, for a turnout percentage of 74.4.

In the 2013 gubernatorial election, Republican Chris Christie received 61.4% of the vote (4,679 cast), ahead of Democrat Barbara Buono with 37.4% (2,851 votes), and other candidates with 1.2% (95 votes), among the 7,845 ballots cast by the township's 21,636 registered voters (220 ballots were spoiled), for a turnout of 36.3%. In the 2009 gubernatorial election, Democrat Jon Corzine received 50.% of the vote (4,126 ballots cast), ahead of both Republican Chris Christie with 44.2% (3,645 votes) and Independent Chris Daggett with 3.8% (315 votes), with 8,248 ballots cast among the township's 19,611 registered voters, yielding a 42.1% turnout.

In the 2016 presidential election, Democrat Hillary Clinton received 60.8% of the vote (9,037 cast), ahead of Republican Donald Trump with 34% (5050 votes), and other candidates with 3.0% (447 votes), among the 14,862 ballots cast by the township's 21,393 registered, for a turnout of 69.5%.

Education 
Students in pre-kindergarten through eighth grade attend the Voorhees Township Public Schools. As of the 2019–20 school year, the district, comprised of five schools, had an enrollment of 2,976 students and 228.6 classroom teachers (on an FTE basis), for a student–teacher ratio of 13.0:1. Schools in the district (with 2019–20 enrollment data from the National Center for Education Statistics) are Edward T. Hamilton Elementary School with 384 students in grades K–5, Kresson Elementary School with 382 students in grades K–5, Osage Elementary School with 684 students in grades K–5, 
Signal Hill Elementary School with 485 students in grades Pre-K–5, and Voorhees Middle School with 1,018 students in grades 6–8. For the 2003–2004 school year, Edward T. Hamilton Elementary School was recognized as a National Blue Ribbon School by the United States Department of Education, one of 233 selected nationwide.

Public school students in ninth through twelfth grades attend the Eastern Camden County Regional High School District, a limited-purpose, public regional school district that serves students at Eastern Regional High School from the constituent communities of Berlin Borough, Gibbsboro and Voorhees Township. As of the 2019–2020 school year, the high school had an enrollment of 1,928 students and 140.4 classroom teachers (on an FTE basis), for a student–teacher ratio of 13.7:1. The district's board of education has nine members who set policy and oversee the fiscal and educational operation of the district through its administration. Representation on the Board of Education is determined by the population of each of the three sending districts, with six seats allocated to Voorhees Township.

Voorhees is home to two private schools. Kellman Brown Academy, formerly Harry B. Kellman Academy, is a private Jewish day school serving children aged 3 through 8th grade which had an enrollment of 120 students as of the 2017–2018 school year. The school was founded in 1958 in association with Congregation Beth El at Parkside in Camden and has been located in Voorhees independently since October 2008 as part of the Solomon Schechter Day School Association.

Naudain Academy is a Montessori education program for children from preschool to kindergarten, located near Kresson Elementary School. Naudain Academy first opened in 1977.

The largest branch of the Camden County Library is located in Voorhees. Officially named the M. Allan Vogelson Regional Branch, it was established in 1969.

Transportation

Roads and highways

The only major highway that passes through Voorhees is Route 73 (Berlin-Kresson Road), which travels from the southern border with Berlin Township towards Evesham Township in Burlington County. Interstate 295 and Route 70 provide access to nearby Philadelphia via Cherry Hill.  Exit 32 of Interstate 295 is partially signed for Voorhees, though motorists can also use exits 29A (U.S. Route 30/Berlin), 31 (Woodcrest Station) or 36 (Route 73) to access parts of the township.

County Route 544 (Evesham Road) runs along the border with Cherry Hill on the north side of the township and County Route 561 (Haddonfield-Berlin Road) clips the southwest corner of the township, from Berlin Township in the south, passes through Gibbsboro, reenters the township's northwest corner before heading into Cherry Hill.

Public transportation
One station on the PATCO Speedline rail system, Ashland, is located within township limits. The Woodcrest and Lindenwold stations are also easily accessible to many residents.

NJ Transit bus service is offered between the township and Philadelphia on the 403 route, with local service provided by the 451 and 459 routes.

Notable people

People (and animals) who were born in, residents of, or otherwise closely associated with Voorhees Township include:
 Amirah Ali (born 1998), soccer forward and midfielder who plays for San Diego Wave FC of the National Women's Soccer League.
 Alene S. Ammond (1933–2019), politician known as "The Terror of Trenton", who served in the New Jersey Senate from the 6th Legislative District from 1974 to 1978
 Ron Anderson (born 1958), played on several NBA teams, as well as in Europe
 Eli Apple (born 1995), football cornerback for the Cincinnati Bengals
 Andrew Bailey (born 1984), All-Star closer for the Boston Red Sox, current coach for the San Francisco Giants
 Hank Baskett (born 1982), free agent wide receiver who had played for the Philadelphia Eagles
 James Beach (born 1946), member of the New Jersey Senate
 Barrett Brooks (born 1972), offensive tackle for the Pittsburgh Steelers
 Stanley Brotman (1924–2014), Judge of the United States District Court for the District of New Jersey
 Chris Canty (born 1976), former professional football cornerback
 Sarah Chang (born 1980), violinist
 Prince Chunk (1998–2010), a cat that weighed as much as 
 Brian Dawkins (born 1973), former free safety for the Philadelphia Eagles
 Malik Ellison (born 1996), professional basketball player for BC Kolín of the Czech National Basketball League
 Pervis Ellison (born 1967), basketball player who played for 11 NBA seasons and was the first player selected in the 1989 NBA Draft
 Josh Farro (born 1987), former guitarist of the pop-punk band Paramore Currently in the band Farro.
 Zac Farro (born 1990), sole member of Half Noise and drummer of Paramore
 Joe Flacco (born 1985), quarterback who plays for the Baltimore Ravens of the National Football League
 Tom Flacco (born 1994), quarterback for the Saskatchewan Roughriders of the Canadian Football League
 Christina Foggie (born 1992), professional basketball player, who was drafted in 2014 by the Minnesota Lynx of the WNBA
 English Gardner (born 1992), track and field sprinter who specializes in the 100-meter dash
 Arie Gill-Glick (1930–2016), Israeli Olympic runner
 Mike Golic Jr. (born 1989), football offensive guard for the Arizona Rattlers of the Arena Football League 
 Scott Graham (born 1965), former sports broadcaster for the Philadelphia Phillies
 Louis Greenwald (born 1967), represents the 6th Legislative District in the New Jersey General Assembly
 Dana Hall (born 1969),  jazz drummer, percussionist, composer, bandleader, and ethnomusicologist
 Elie Honig, attorney and CNN senior legal analyst
 Ron Jaworski (born 1951), former NFL player on the Philadelphia Eagles
 Jill Kelley (born 1975), socialite whose emails led to disclosure of the Petraeus scandal
 Craig MacTavish (born 1958), former NHL hockey player
 Jimmy McGriff (1936–2008), jazz and blues organist
 Leonard Neidorf (born ), philologist who specializes in the study of Old English and Middle English literature, and is a known authority on Beowulf
 Tommy Paul (born 1997), professional tennis player
 Hébert Peck (born 1958), filmmaker who produced the documentary film, I Am Not Your Negro, which received a Best Documentary Feature nomination at the 89th Academy Awards
 Raoul Peck (born 1953), award-winning Haitian filmmaker
 Rev. Scott Pilarz, S.J., (1959–2021), Jesuit priest and academic who served as President of Marquette University
 Mary Previte (1932–2019), member of the New Jersey General Assembly who represented the 6th Legislative District from 1998 to 2006
 Keith Primeau (born 1971), played on the Philadelphia Flyers
 Molly Schaus (born 1988), ice hockey goaltender who played for the United States women's national ice hockey team that won the silver medal at the 2010 Winter Olympics
 Lauren Schmetterling (born 1988), rower, three-time World Rowing Championships gold medalist, Olympic gold medalist
 Phillip Scott, politician who represents the 88th district in the Virginia House of Delegates
 Mel Shaw (1946–2017), racing driver who competed in the 24 Hours of Daytona and died at age 70 in a Trans-Am Series crash at Brainerd International Raceway
 Devin Smeltzer (born 1995), professional baseball pitcher for the Minnesota Twins
 Chris St. Croix (born 1979), hockey defenseman
 Adam Taliaferro (born 1982), played on the Penn State Nittany Lions football team
 Jeremy Thompson (born 1985), NFL player for the Green Bay Packers
 Madison Tiernan (born 1995), soccer midfielder who plays for Sky Blue FC of National Women's Soccer League
 Phil Trautwein (born 1986), offensive tackle who has played for the St. Louis Rams
 Julia Udine (born 1993), actress who performed as Christine on the North American tour of The Phantom of the Opera
 John Vukovich (1947–2007), former MLB third baseman, best known for his career with the Philadelphia Phillies
 Toyelle Wilson (born 1981), assistant basketball coach with the Baylor Lady Bears basketball team
 Kelsi Worrell (born 1994), American competition swimmer specializing in the butterfly who won the gold medal in the 100-meter butterfly at the 2015 Pan American Games in Toronto
 Brandon Wynn (born 1988), artistic gymnast who won a bronze medal in the Still Rings event at the 2013 World Artistic Gymnastics Championships

References

External links

 
1899 establishments in New Jersey
Populated places established in 1899
Township form of New Jersey government
Townships in Camden County, New Jersey
Voorhees family